Ellen Sofie Olsvik (born 7 July 1962) is a Norwegian orienteering competitor, world champion in the relay event, and winner of the first overall Orienteering World Cup. She is also world champion in ski-orienteering.

Career
Olsvik won a gold medal in the relay event at the 1987 World Orienteering Championships, together with Ragnhild Bratberg, Ragnhild Bente Andersen and Brit Volden. She received a silver medal in 1985.

Olsvik won the first overall Orienteering World Cup in 1986, with a total score of 112 points, before Jorunn Teigen (108 points) and Karin Rabe (101 points).

She received a gold medal in relay at the 1986 World Ski Orienteering Championships in Batak, Bulgaria, together with Toril Hallan and Ragnhild Bratberg. She also competed in cross-country skiing, with a silver medal in the 20 km race at the national championships.

She represented the clubs Nydalens SK, Bækkelagets SK, NTHI, Orkanger IF and Byåsen IL.

References

1962 births
Living people
Norwegian orienteers
Ski-orienteers
Foot orienteers
Norwegian female cross-country skiers
Female orienteers
World Orienteering Championships medalists
20th-century Norwegian women